The Kushiro Ice Arena (釧路アイスアリーナ) is an arena in the city of Kushiro, Hokkaidō, Japan. It is primarily used for ice hockey, and is the home arena of East Hokkaido Cranes of the Asia League Ice Hockey. The arena was formerly the home of the Nippon Paper Cranes, until their demise in 2019. 

It was opened in 1996 and holds 2,539 seats, plus near 500 standing-room only.

It is situated in the Japan National Route 38 close to the Nippon Paper plant, former owners of the Paper Cranes.

References
 Japanese Hockey Arenas 

Indoor ice hockey venues in Japan
Indoor arenas in Japan
Sports venues completed in 1996
Sports venues in Hokkaido
Kushiro, Hokkaido
1996 establishments in Japan